The Jon M. Huntsman School of Business is located at Utah State University in Logan, Utah.

History
The business school was originally founded in 1888 as the college's Commercial Department. The first students graduated from the course in 1894 at a time when the only four-year business school in existence was the Wharton School of the University of Pennsylvania.

In its first two decades, the program went through several organizational revisions and  name changes. By 1911, the program (then named School of Commerce) was already recognized as a leading business institution. A 1911 newspaper, reporting about the economics department, said:

In 1918, the school became known as the School of Commerce and Business Administration.  At that time, the school then included five departments: markets, business administration, accounting, political science, and history. Other majors continued to be added over time.

In 1952, under the direction of professor C. D. McBride, the Management Institute came into existence. Utah's economy was rapidly shifting from agriculture to business, and Utah State University, as the land-grant institution in Utah, had an obligation to provide educational services in business and industry throughout Utah comparable to those offered in agriculture and rural life through the Cooperative Extension Service. The Management Institute was in charge of providing the services of business educational services.

By 1957, the School of Commerce and Business Administration had become the College of Business and Social Sciences, with M. R. Merrill as dean. Of the four departments, three were strictly social science: history and political science, economics and sociology. In 1959, Robert P. Collier became acting dean. The college included the departments of business administration and secretarial science, history and political science, sociology and social work, and economics.

By 1966, business courses were taught in more than a dozen buildings on  campus. Accounting, which had enjoyed department status early in the college's history but had been under business administration for many years, became a separate department again. In addition to the accounting department, the College of Business included six other departments along with The Division of Military Science and aerospace studies.

The time had come for the college to have its own building. The Utah Building Board approved a $600,000 federal grant for a business building, and on Jan. 11, 1967, the schematic plans for the building were approved by the USU Board of Trustees. The groundbreaking ceremony was held on Dec. 10, 1968, with a projected cost of $1,591,700 for the structure. On May 8, 1970, the building was dedicated as the George S. Eccles Business Building.

The Eccles Building reaches nine stories high. At the time of its building, it included a three-story classroom base, and six additional stories of faculty offices, seminar rooms and other facilities. The building has since gone through multiple renovations .

The undergraduate program of the College of Business was accredited by the Association to Advance Collegiate Schools of Business (AACSB) in 1971, and in 1981 the graduate (master's) program was accredited by AACSB.

In February 1983, the department of accounting became the school of accountancy. By 1986, the College of Business had a full-time enrollment of approximately 1,398 students in its undergraduate and graduate programs (Self-Study Report, 1986). Thirty-nine full-time faculty and 32 part-time faculty were employed in three departments: business administration, administrative systems and business education, and accounting. The department of economics remained under the joint administration of the colleges of business and agriculture.

In 2007, Utah State's College of Business became the Jon M. Huntsman School of Business after a $26 million donation by the Huntsman Foundation.

On March 16, 2016, Jon M. Huntsman Hall was dedicated and opened. The building is a 125,000 square foot student-centered facility that provides 21 classrooms, 21 meeting spaces, faculty/administration offices and event spaces.

On May 6, 2017, the Huntsman School announced a joint $50 million gift from the Huntsman Foundation and the Charles Koch Foundation, the largest in the school's history.

On November 2, 2018, The Stephen R. Covey Leadership Center was established; its purpose is to develop principle-centered leaders.

As of 2019, the Huntsman School offers 7 undergraduate majors and 6 graduate programs.

Location

The George S. Eccles Business Building underwent a major renovation, in 2008, made possible by a grant of $1 million from the George S. and Dolores Doré Eccles Foundation.

In 2011, the Utah Legislature approved funding for a new business building, Jon M. Huntsman Hall, located southwest of the Eccles Business Building. The building was funded by $36 million in private funds and $14 million in state funds. The 125,000-square-foot building includes 21 classrooms, 21 student meeting rooms, office spaces and multiple event spaces.

Academics
The Huntsman School consists of five academic departments: Accounting, Economics and Finance, Management, Management Information Systems, Marketing and Strategy. As of 2019, the school has 105 faculty members and 63 staff members.

Undergraduate offerings 
The Huntsman School offers 7 majors which encompass the core business disciplines and 16 specialized minors.

 Accounting
 Business Administration
 Data Analytics and Information Systems
 Economics
 Finance
 International Business
 Marketing

Graduate offerings 
The Huntsman School offers 6 business graduate programs. All 6 graduate programs are offered on-campus to full-time students. MBA and MHR are available as part-time programs with delivery methods tailored for working professionals. The school also offers concurrent enrollment graduate programs. Students can select two majors from MBA, MHR and MMIS and complete 2 graduate degrees in 2 years.

 Master of Accounting (MAcc)
 Master of Business Administration (MBA)
 Master of Human Resources (MHR)
 Master of Management Information Systems (MMIS)
 Master of Science in Economics (MSE)
 Master of Financial Economics (MFE)

Centers

The Center for Entrepreneurship offers classes, internships and competitions. Its programs include: Entrepreneurship Leadership and Huntsman Venture Forum Speaker Series, an entrepreneurship minor, the Small Enterprise Education and Development (SEED) internship program and various competitions. In 2019, the United States Association for Small Business and Entrepreneurship (USASBE) awarded the School first place for Excellence in Co-Curricular Innovation for its Small Enterprise Education and Development (SEED) Program.
FJ Management Center for Student Success  brings together various student services, including academic student advising and career development under one organizational structure.
Stephen R. Covey Leadership Center goal is to develop principle-centered leaders through its curriculum, co-curricular activities and coaching.
Shingo Institute  offers educational workshops and executive education programs, organizes study tours, hosts an annual conference, and annually awards the Shingo Prize for Operational Excellence.
The Center for Growth and Opportunity trains undergraduate and graduate students, conducts economic research with a national network of scholars, and communicates transformative solutions to some of the country’s most pressing issues.

Experiential learning and offerings

Huntsman Scholar Program is a selective honors undergraduate business program on the Logan campus. Students receive a stipend for up to four years, a fully funded global learning experience, and participate in curricular, co-curricular, and extra-curricular experiences. Students are assigned a faculty mentor and have the opportunity to build relationships with faculty, staff, alumni, and fellow students.
Small Enterprise Education and Development Program (SEED) connects students with opportunities that teach enterprise creation and sustainability in Ghana, Guatemala, Peru, Philippines, and the Dominican Republic.
Focused Fridays at the School are dedicated to job search workshops, technical training, keynote forums, and networking opportunities. 
Global Learning Experiences prepares students for an international business environment. Program options include: summer programs to Asia and South America and spring break programs to London and Paris, and semester exchange programs and international internships.

People

Faculty
In 2006, Dr. Douglas D. Anderson became the dean of the College of Business at Utah State University. A year later, he was instrumental in securing a $25 million gift from Jon M. Huntsman Sr. for the college, which was renamed the Jon M. Huntsman School of Business. In 2016, Anderson helped secure a $50 million collaborative gift ($25 million from the Huntsman Foundation and $25 from the Koch foundation). Dr. Anderson is a Utah State University and Harvard University graduate. 
In 2010, Utah State University and the Huntsman School of Business announced that Stephen R. Covey would join its faculty as the school's first Jon M. Huntsman Presidential Chair. Covey was the author of Seven Habits of Highly Effective People. In 2021, the Huntsman School hired Oxford professor Teppo Felin to become the inaugural Douglas D Anderson Endowed Professor of Strategy and Entrepreneurship.

Alumni

 Gar Forman '84 - General Manager, Chicago Bulls
 Eric Hipple '80 - former NFL Quarterback, Detroit Lions
 Merlin Olsen '62 - Athlete, Los Angeles Rams; Broadcaster, NBC Sports; Actor.
 L. Tom Perry '49 - Apostle, The Church of Jesus Christ of Latter-day Saints
 Steven E. Snow '74 - General Authority, The Church of Jesus Christ of Latter-day Saints
 Christopher "Chris" Stewart '84 - Best Selling Author, New York Times; Congressman, Utah's 2nd congressional district.
 Gary E. Stevenson '79 - Apostle, The Church of Jesus Christ of Latter-day Saints; Co-founder of ICON Health & Fitness

Controversy
On November 13, 2017, The Utah Statesman published an article about the college secretly spending differential tuition without the permission of an advisory board. An amount totally over $8 million annually. At the Huntsman School of Business, students are required to annually pay $2,000+ more than other students at Utah State University, but these business students were told they get a voice in how that money will be spent. That voice would be the 3-5 students on the Advisory Board. But the board had never met, and when Business Senator Nadir Tekarli (student) tried to get the board to meet he was met with problems from administration. Due to the backlash following The Utah Statesman publication the administration caved and had their first Advisory Board meeting. This story has also been covered by the Salt Lake Tribune.

References

External links
 Jon M. Huntsman School of Business
 Utah State University

Utah State University
Business schools in Utah
Educational institutions established in 1888
1888 establishments in Utah Territory
University subdivisions in Utah